The Hager Twins, also known as the Hager Brothers and The Hagers, were a duo of American country music singers and comedians who gained fame on the TV series Hee Haw. They were identical twin brothers James Henry Hager (August 30, 1941 – May 1, 2008) and John William Hager (August 30, 1941 – January 9, 2009).

Biography
The brothers were born August 30, 1941 in Chicago, Illinois and adopted by Jack and Frances Hager, a Methodist minister and a schoolteacher.

They first sang in the church choir. As teenagers they sang on a Saturday morning WGN-TV series targeting others in their age group. Both brothers served in the United States Army and performed at officers' and non-commissioned officers' clubs in the United States and Europe.

They attended Maine Township High School in Park Ridge (Class of 1959), one year ahead of Harrison Ford and a few years ahead of Hillary Clinton.

After leaving the military, the Hager brothers moved to California and performed at the Ledbetter's Night Club in Los Angeles with The Carpenters, The New Christy Minstrels, John Denver, Steve Martin, and Kenny Rogers. They also worked at Disneyland, where Buck Owens saw them perform and signed them to contracts. The brothers served as opening acts for Owens, Tex Ritter, Wynn Stewart, Billie Jo Spears, and Lefty Frizzell.

They first came to national prominence on the CBS television series Hee Haw, on which both were cast members from 1969 to 1986.  In 1979 they appeared on the nationally-syndicated New Soupy Sales Show, singing "Pizza Man."

The Hager brothers signed with Capitol Records in 1969 and hit the country charts with "Gotta Get To Oklahoma ('Cause California's Gettin' To Me)". They also charted Merle Haggard's "Silver Wings", which was the B-Side of Haggard's "Working Man Blues."  In all, they recorded seven albums—three for Capitol, two for Elektra-Asylum, one for Barnaby Records, and one for Book Shop Records.

The brothers were featured in the second preview issue of Playgirl, February 1973.

Their TV appearances also include the original The Bionic Woman, in which Jim and Jon played cloned detectives Verm and Dier in the February 11, 1978 episode "Sanctuary Earth."

In 1976, the brothers starred as private detectives opposite Lillian Gish in the TV-movie Twin Detectives. They also appeared in TV commercials and with Florence Henderson in Country Kitchen on TNN.

The Hager Brothers also contributed to numerous charities.

Jim Hager died of an apparent heart attack on May 1, 2008 in Nashville, Tennessee. Eight months later, surviving twin Jon Hager died in his sleep on January 9, 2009, also in Nashville.

Discography

Albums

Singles

References

American country music groups
American twins
Identical twin males
Twin musical duos
20th-century American male singers
20th-century American singers
Male musical duos
1941 births
2000s deaths
Playgirl Men of the Month